Zygiocetus is an extinct genus of cetotheriid mysticete in the subfamily Cetotheriinae. The type and only species is Zygiocetus nartorum, known from the Late Miocene (Messinian) of Adygea in the Russian Caucasus.

Zygiocetus nartorum is distinguished from other cetotheriines in having slightly arched lambdoid crests, and it is distinct from Cetotherium and Kurdalagonus in having a wide supraoccipital that is shaped like an extended isosceles triangle with arched lateral sides.

References 

Baleen whales
Miocene cetaceans
Prehistoric cetacean genera
Fossil taxa described in 2014
Miocene mammals of Europe